The Catalina 275 Sport is an American sailboat, that was designed by Gerry Douglas primarily for racing and day sailing.

Production
The boat is built by Catalina Yachts in the United States, with production starting in 2013. It remained in production in 2018.

Design

The Catalina 275 Sport is a small recreational keelboat, built predominantly of fiberglass. It has a fractional sloop rig, a plumb stem, an open reverse transom, an internally-mounted spade-type rudder and a fixed fin keel or optional wing keel. It is equipped with a carbon fiber reinforced polymer tiller and basic accommodations for sleeping, including a galley and an enclosed head. A retractable bowsprit is optional.

The boat is fitted with a Yanmar 2Y1M5  diesel inboard engine, powering a saildrive two-bladed propeller.

See also
List of sailing boat types

Similar sailboats
Aloha 27
Archambault A27
C&C 27
C&C SR 27
Cal 27
Cal 2-27
Cal 3-27
Catalina 27
Catalina 270
Crown 28
CS 27
Express 27
Fantasia 27
Hotfoot 27
Hullmaster 27
Hunter 27
Hunter 27-2
Hunter 27-3
Mirage 27 (Perry)
Mirage 27 (Schmidt)
O'Day 272
Orion 27-2
Tanzer 27

References

External links

Keelboats
1980s sailboat type designs
Sailing yachts
Sailboat types built by Catalina Yachts
Sailboat type designs by Gerry Douglas